The ICC World Cricket League (WCL) was a series of international one-day cricket tournaments for national teams without Test status (i.e., teams of Associate status) administered by the International Cricket Council. All Associate Members of the ICC were eligible to compete in the league system, which featured a promotion and relegation structure between divisions. The league system had two main aims: to provide a qualification system for the Cricket World Cup that could be accessed by all Associate Members and as an opportunity for these sides to play international one-day matches against teams of similar standards.

The league began in 2007, where teams were allocated into divisions based on their performance in the qualification tournaments for the 2007 World Cup; the six initial teams in Division One were the teams that had qualified for the 2007 World Cup. At this stage, there were only five divisions. The WCL expanded to eight divisions at one point.

The WCL was a pathway to the Cricket World Cup until 2019. Following the conclusion of the 2019 Division Two tournament, the WCL was replaced by the ICC Cricket World Cup League 2 and the ICC Cricket World Cup Challenge League. The final rankings from the WCL were used to place teams into the two new leagues.

Structure
The initial league began in 2007 with seven tournaments over five global divisions, based upon previous world rankings. This was expanded into eight separate divisions by 2010. In the first cycle, the number of teams in each tournament varied from six to twelve. With the advent of the second cycle, the number of teams was regularised to six for each tournament, with the exception of the lowest division, Division 8, in which eight teams played. As from 2015, the number of divisions was again reduced to just five.

When most of the divisions are played, two teams will be promoted, two relegated and two remain for the next instalment (normally two years later). At the end of each cycle, a World Cup Qualifier is played. In 2018, this featured the four lowest teams of those holding 'Full' (senior) status, together with six 'Associate' nations namely the four who were still in Division One, plus the top two from Division Two. The two last-placed teams in that World Cup Qualifier lost their ODI status and were relegated into Division Two.

Regional tournaments, which act as qualifiers for the lowest division of the World League, are administered by the five development regions of the International Cricket Council: Africa, Americas, Asia, East Asia-Pacific, and Europe.

Results

Summary

Division results

Associate one-day rankings

In late 2005, the International Cricket Council ranked the top non-Test nations from 11–30 to complement the Test nations' rankings in the ICC ODI Championship. The ICC used the results from the 2005 ICC Trophy and WCQS Division 2 competition (i.e. the primary qualification mechanisms for the 2007 Cricket World Cup) to rank the nations.

These rankings were used to seed the initial stage of the global World Cricket League. Teams ranked 11–16 were placed into Division 1; teams 17–20 were placed into Division 2; teams 21–24 were placed into Division 3; the remaining teams were placed into the upper divisions of their respective regional qualifiers.

In 2005, six associates were assigned One Day International status, based on their performance at the preceding World Cup Qualifier. In 2017, Afghanistan and Ireland were both promoted to "Full" (test-match) status, leaving only four associate nations with ODI-status: after mid-March 2018 these were Scotland, Netherlands, UAE, and Nepal. Netherlands, as winners of the 2015–17 ICC World Cricket League Championship, have qualified for a place in the 2020–22 ICC Cricket World Cup Super League.
In May 2009, the ICC added a rankings table for the associate and affiliate members containing both global and regional placings. In 2016 this changed to maintain a global list only for the top teams and a set of regional lists for the remaining teams.

Rankings

The global rankings of associate teams according to ICC are published in the table below. Teams that have One Day International status are now included on the main ICC ODI Championship and are listed in the order they appear on that table. The other teams are ranked by their finishing position in the most recent qualifying tournament.

The rankings at the end of the WCL:

Regional rankings

Teams that do not participate in (or have been relegated from) the World Cricket League are ranked by their finishing positions in their respective regional leagues:

** Not member of ICC, but member of Asian Cricket Council.

See also
ICC Intercontinental Cup – the equivalent first class competition
ICC World Twenty20 Qualifier – a competition between associate and affiliate teams for entry into the Twenty20 World Cup

References

External links
 ICC World Cricket League

 
International Cricket Council events
One Day International cricket competitions
Recurring sporting events established in 2007
Recurring sporting events disestablished in 2019